Abba-El I (reigned  - Middle chronology ) was the king of Yamhad (Halab), succeeding his father Hammurabi I.

Reign
Hammurabi I left Yamhad a prosperous country, and Abba-El's reign was relatively peaceful. He maintained good commercial relations with Babylon. The main event of his reign was the rebellion of Zitraddu, governor of the city Irridu which belonged along with its district to Abba-El's brother Yarim-Lim

A tablet discovered at Alalakh explains the circumstances which led to the forming of the kingdom of Alalakh; it revealed that Abba-El destroyed Irridu and compensated his brother by giving him Alalakh as a hereditary kingdom for his dynasty under the suzerainty of Aleppo but that it should be forfeited if Yarim-Lim or his descendants committed treason against Yamhad.

Abba-El took an oath upon himself not to confiscate his brother's new kingdom and that he might be cursed if he ever did. In return Yarim-Lim took an oath of loyalty to his brother, specifying that if he or his descendants ever committed treason or spilled Abba-El's secrets to another king, their lands would be forfeited.

The Hurrians's influence seems clear during Abba-El's reign, as he recalls the help given to him by the Hurrian Goddess Hebat.

Death and Ancestors
Abba-El died in ca. 1720 BC and was succeeded by Yarim-Lim II, who most probably was his son; however, Moshe Weinfeld believes that Yarim-Lim II was the same as Yarim-Lim of Alalakh.

References

Citations

18th-century BC rulers
Kings of Yamhad
People from Aleppo
Amorite kings
Yamhad dynasty
18th-century people